Timothy David Spector  (born 1958) is a British epidemiologist, medical doctor, and science writer.

Biography
Spector was born in North London in July 1958. He trained in medicine and rose to the position of consultant rheumatologist, before turning to genetic epidemiology, the study of genetic factors in health and disease, in 1992.

Spector is professor of genetic epidemiology and director of the TwinsUK registry at King's College London. He is a specialist in twin studies, genetics, epigenetics, and microbiome and diet.

He was appointed Officer of the Order of the British Empire (OBE) in the 2020 Birthday Honours for services to the Covid-19 response. He was also appointed Senior Investigator at the National Institute for Health Research (NIHR).

Twin studies 
Spector's team at King's College have, since 1992, enrolled 15,000 sets of identical twins in the TwinsUK studies, leading to many studies on the heritability of diseases and disorders. Spector states the goal is "to understand nature versus nurture".

The Diet Myth

Spector's book The Diet Myth: The Real Science Behind What We Eat was published in 2015. The book explains how gut microbiotas interact with different dietary habits and how the gut microbiome can determine health and longevity. It received positive reviews in science journals. Spector argues for a diet that increases gut microbe diversity. To do this he recommends increasing fibre content, avoiding junk and processed foods and experimenting with different fresh foods.

Spector has argued against low-fat and fad diets. He recommends a varied high-fibre Mediterranean-style diet with plenty of nuts and vegetables.

Spoon Fed 
In his latest book Spoon Fed, Spector discusses how microbes may affect mental health.

COVID Symptom Study 

In March 2020, during the onset of the COVID-19 pandemic in the UK, Spector made use of twins already taking part in a genetic study to begin an investigation of COVID-19 symptoms. Working with researchers at King's College, Guy's and St Thomas' Hospitals, an app used by twins to record nutrition was used as the basis for the COVID Symptom Study app to allow members of the public to make a daily record of their symptoms and state of health. By July 2020 the app had more than 4 million users, and the next month the project received grant funding from the Department of Health and Social Care. Development and operation of the app involves Zoe Global Limited (now Zoe Limited), a nutrition advice company co-founded by Spector in 2017.

Spector became the public face of the study, releasing periodic summaries via YouTube from June 2020 onwards.

Selected publications

References

External links 
 Official website
 
 
 
 

1958 births
Living people
Alumni of the London School of Hygiene & Tropical Medicine
Academics of King's College London
British epidemiologists
British geneticists
British science writers
Diet food advocates
Fellows of the Academy of Medical Sciences (United Kingdom)
NIHR Senior Investigators
Genetic epidemiologists
High-fiber diet advocates
Officers of the Order of the British Empire